The 1909 Kilkenny Senior Hurling Championship was the 21st staging of the Kilkenny Senior Hurling Championship since its establishment by the Kilkenny County Board.

On 1 May 1910, Erin's Own won the championship after a 1–12 to 1–07 defeat of Mooncoin in the final. This was their second championship title overall and their first in four championship seasons.

Results

Final

References

Kilkenny Senior Hurling Championship
Kilkenny Senior Hurling Championship